Stig Olin, né Högberg (11 September 1920 – 28 June 2008) was a Swedish actor, theatre director, songwriter and singer. 
He was the father of actress Lena Olin and singer Mats Olin. He was married to film actresses Britta Holmberg and Helena Kallenbäck.

Career

Acting
Olin had a successful acting career, appearing in lead roles in a number of early Ingmar Bergman films, including Torment/Frenzy (1944; Bergman's script debut), Crisis (1946), Kvinna utan ansikte (Woman Without a Face) (1947; script by Bergman), Port of Call (1948), Eva (1948; script by Bergman), Prison (1949), To Joy (1950), Summer Interlude (1951) and Divorced (1951; script by Bergman).

Successful film roles also included a love struck student in the Sickan Carlsson film Klasskamrater (1952), Ernst in his own popular children's film Rasmus, Pontus och Toker (1956) and the scrubby old Potato-Algot in Jim och piraterna Blom (1987), directed by Hans Alfredson (from Hasse & Tage).

Film and play director
Olin then moved on to directing for both film and stage in the 1950s, 60s and 70s, focusing on comedies and musicals (including the original Swedish staging of Stephen Sondheim's A Little Night Music in 1978). In 1970 he became Director of Programmes at Swedish Radio, including the Swedish radio theatre, where he also directed a number of plays.

Songwriter
He was also a songwriter with En gång jag seglar i hamn, På söndag, Människors glädje, Jag tror på sommaren and Karusellvisan, a.o.

Partial filmography

 Kronans käcka gossar (1940) - Military
 Bright Prospects (1941) - Bertil Bergström
 Tonight or Never (1941) - Young Man (scenes deleted)
 Goransson's Boy (1941) - Young man at Norr Mälarstrand (uncredited)
 The Fight Continues (1941) - Judge
 Stackars Ferdinand (1941) - Young man (scenes deleted)
 Prästen som slog knockout (1943) - Young Man (uncredited)
 The Sin of Anna Lans (1943) - Arne
 Young Blood (1943) - Pelle Persson
 Ordet (1943) - Anders
 Live Dangerously (1944) - Parachuting Saboteur
 The Invisible Wall (1944) - Worker (uncredited)
 Torment (1944) - Sandman - Student (uncredited)
 Oss tjuvar emellan eller En burk ananas (1945) - Gustav, young worker (uncredited)
 Tre söner gick till flyget (1945) - Olle - Familjen Hallman
 Två människor (1945) - Svenning (voice, uncredited)
 Crisis (1946) - Jack
 Johansson and Vestman (1946) - Rusan
 Incorrigible (1946) - Krister Sundbom
 The Balloon (1946) - Michael Kollinsky
 Jens Mansson in America (1947) - Johnny Andersson
 Woman Without a Face (1947) - Ragnar Ekberg
 Each to His Own Way (1948) - Fredrik Salén
 Port of Call (1948) - Thomas - Young Man in the Stairs (uncredited)
 Eva (1948) - Göran
 Dangerous Spring (1949) - Gustaf Eriksson
 Prison (1949) - Peter
 Flickan från tredje raden (1949) - Kalle Nilsson
 To Joy (1950) - Stig Eriksson
 Sånt händer inte här (1950) - The Young Man / narrator
 The Quartet That Split Up (1950) - Werner
 Summer Interlude (1951) - Ballet Master
 Frånskild (1951) - Hans
 One Fiancée at a Time (1952) - Jerker Nordin
 Classmates (1952) - Stig Andersson
 Farlig kurva (1952) - Tjoffe Käll
 Barabbas (1953) - Member of Barabbas' Gang
 Resan till dej (1953, director & writer with Hasse Ekman) - Messenger in Leather Jacket (uncredited)
 I dur och skur (1953, director)
 The Yellow Squadron (1954, director) - Boman
 The Magnificent Lie (1955) - Goronflot
 Mord, lilla vän (1955) - Dick Mattsson
 Whoops! (1955, director)
 Seventh Heaven (1956) - Berättarröst (voice, uncredited)
 Swing it, fröken (1956) - Singing Student (uncredited)
 Stage Entrance (1956) - Bernard Stensson
 Rasmus, Pontus och Toker (1956, director) - Ernst
 Sjunde himlen (1956, speaker)
 A Guest in His Own House (1957, writer & director)
 More Than a Match for the Navy (1958, director)
 Du är mitt äventyr (1958, director, writer Hasse Ekman & Stig Olin)
 Det svänger på slottet (1959, writer with Hasse Ekman)
 Jim och piraterna Blom (1987) - Potatis-Algot
 Vargens tid (1988) - Tiggaren
 Tre kärlekar (1991, TV Series) - Vicar

References

External links

Sven Olin on Swedish Film Database
Obituary

1920 births
2008 deaths
Musicians from Stockholm
Swedish male actors
Swedish songwriters
Swedish theatre directors